The Miami Police Department (MPD), also known as the City of Miami Police Department, is a full-service municipal law enforcement agency serving Miami, Florida. MPD is the largest municipal police department in Florida. MPD officers are distinguishable from their Miami-Dade Police Department counterparts by their blue uniforms and blue-and-white patrol vehicles.

MPD operates the Miami Police College, which houses three schools: The Police Academy Class (PAC), The School for Professional Development (SPD), and the International Policing Institute (IPI), a program focused on training law enforcement personnel from countries outside of the United States.

History
In its early years, the MPD enacted an oppressive racial system in Miami. The MPD did not protect the black community from violence, as well as aided in the harassment and terrorization of the black population. The MPD intimidated black voters, pursued blacks on flimsy evidence, and strongly enforced certain laws solely when blacks were in violation of them. The MPD tacitly approved of or failed to investigate instances of white supremacist violence in Miami by terrorist groups such as the Ku Klux Klan.

In 1986 reporting on corruption scandals in the MPD, the New York Times wrote of the MPD that "corruption charges are not new" to the department. In 2018, the Miami New Times wrote, "Miami cops have a storied history of getting caught committing the very crimes they are supposed to police."

Jorge Colina became MPD Chief of Police in 2018. In March 2021, Art Acevedo became Miami Police Department chief. Prior to this role, he served as the chief of police in Houston.

Civil rights investigations by U.S. Department of Justice
The U.S. Department of Justice (DOJ) investigated the Miami Police Department twice, once beginning in 2002 and once from 2011–2013.

The investigation by DOJ's Civil Rights Division and the U.S. Attorney's Office for the Southern District of Florida that was completed in 2013 was prompted by a series of incidents over eight months in 2011 in which Miami officers fatally shot seven young black men. The DOJ investigation concluded that the Miami Police Department "engaged in a pattern or practice of excessive use of force through officer-involved shootings in violation of the Fourth Amendment of the Constitution." The investigation reached many of the same conclusions as the 2002 investigation. It found that MPD officers had intentionally fired upon individuals on 33 occasions between 2008 and 2011, and that the MPD itself found that the shootings were unjustified on three occasions. The DOJ also determined that "a number of MPD practices, including deficient tactics, improper actions by specialized units, as well as egregious delays and substantive deficiencies in deadly force investigations, contributed to the pattern or practice of excessive force." The DOJ found that MPD had failed to "complete thorough, objective and timely investigations of officer-involved shootings" and sometimes failed to reach a conclusion "as to whether or not the officer's firearm discharge was lawful and within policy," which the DOJ cited as a factor that "undermined accountability and exposed MPD officers and the community to unreasonable risks that might have been addressed through prompt corrective action." The DOJ also found that "a small number of officers were involved in a disproportionate number of shootings, while the investigations into their shootings continued to be egregiously delayed." 
 
To address the issues it identified, the city negotiated a judicially overseen agreement with the DOJ. Former Chief Miguel A. Exposito rejected the DOJ findings, which he called flawed.

A comprehensive settlement agreement between the DOJ and the City of Miami was reached in February 2016; under the agreement, the police department was obligated to take specific steps to reduce the number of officer-involved shootings (through enhanced training and supervision) and to "more effectively and quickly investigate officer-involved shootings that do occur" (through improvements to the internal investigation process and tighter rules for when an officer who shoots may return to work). Jane Castor, the former police chief of Tampa, Florida, was appointed as the independent monitor to oversee the city's compliance with the reforms.

Controversy over shooting an unarmed suspect
On December 10, 2013, at approximately 0530 hours, 22 police officers surrounded a suspect from an earlier shooting (police officer shot by suspect) and a second uninvolved person. Police ordered the men to put their hands up and then fired over 50 rounds into the car. Witnesses reported police continued to order the men to raise their hands and when they did fired more rounds into the car. In total 22 police officers fired more than 377 rounds hitting the car, other cars, adjacent buildings, their fellow police officers. The gunfire from the police was sufficient that some officers suffered ruptured eardrums. Witnesses reported that after killing the two men, some of the police were laughing.

Controversy over officer arrest
On October 11, 2011, MPD Officer Fausto Lopez was speeding and driving erratically when he was caught by a Florida state trooper after a 7-minute chase, with the video going viral on YouTube. The state trooper initially believed that the MPD cruiser had been stolen, so Lopez was arrested at gunpoint and handcuffed. This started a feud between the Florida Highway Patrol and the MPD (who regarded the arrest as an overreaction), involving police blog accusations and insults, posters attacking the state trooper who stopped Lopez, and someone smearing feces on another trooper's patrol car. An investigation by the South Florida Sun-Sentinel in February 2012 examined SunPass toll records and found that 800 cops from a dozen South Florida agencies drove their cruisers above 90 mph in 2011, mostly while off duty. As a result of the Sun-Sentinel report, 158 state troopers and officers were disciplined, mostly receiving a reprimand and losing their take-home cars for up to six months. Lopez, who was found to have driven 90 mph on more than 80 occasions, was suspended with pay in early July 2012 and terminated from the MPD on September 13, 2012.

Controversy over shooting unarmed motorist
On 11 February 2011 Miami Police killed an unarmed motorist during a traffic stop and wounded another person in the car. Prosecutors declined to prosecute as they did not think they could say it was provable beyond a reasonable doubt that Miami Officer Reynaldo Goyos could have thought the driver was reaching for a weapon.

Retaliation against officers who expose wrongdoing
The Miami Community Police Benevolent Association (MCPBA), the city's Black police officers' union, has criticized the MPD for what it says is a culture of retaliation against police officers who blow the whistle on wrongdoing by fellow MPD officers.

Controversial detainment of African American COVID-19 doctor
In April 2020, a Miami Police Sergeant generated controversy by handcuffing and detaining African American doctor Armen Henderson, who was assigned to treat homeless people for COVID-19, outside his home after receiving complaints that people were dumping trash in the area where he was working. Allegations soon surfaced that the matter in which Henderson was handcuffed and detained was in fact a case of racial profiling. The Miami Police Department eventually agreed to launch an internal investigation into the circumstances surrounding the handcuffing and detainment of Henderson.

Organizational structure
MPD follows a paramilitary organizational structure and is headed by the Chief of Police. The Deputy Chief of Police reports directly to the Chief and oversees the three major operational divisions of the agency, each of which is led by an Assistant Chief: Field Operations Division, Criminal Investigations Division, and Administration Division. The Internal Affairs Section, Professional Compliance Section, and Public Information Office report directly to the Chief of Police.

MPD is composed of more than 70 organizational elements, including a full-time SWAT team, Bomb Squad, Mounted Patrol, Marine Patrol, Aviation Unit, Gang Unit, Police Athletic League Detail, Crime Gun Intelligence Center, and a Real Time Crime Center. With 1371 full-time sworn positions and more than 400 civilian positions.

Districts
Miami is divided into three policing districts, which are in turn divided into thirteen neighborhoods:

North District
Model City
Little Haiti
Upper Eastside

Central District
Allapattah
Overtown
Wynwood
Edgewater
Downtown

South District
Flagami
Little Havana
Coral Way
Coconut Grove
Brickell/Roads

Ranks and insignia 

Rank insignias for sergeants are worn on the upper sleeves below the shoulder patch while rank insignias for lieutenant through chief are worn on the shirt collar.

Demographics
The demographics of full-time sworn personnel are:
Male: 82%
Female: 18%
Hispanic (of any race): 54%
African-American/Black: 27%
non-Hispanic White: 19%
In January 2022, The North Miami Beach Police Department hired Florida's first Orthodox Jewish police officer, Yehuda Topper.

Sidearm
Miami Police Officers are issued the Glock 22. Prior to the Glock 22 officers were armed with the Glock 17, which was in service from the late 1980s to the early 2000s. Detectives are issued either the Glock 23 or the more compact Glock 27. Prior to issuing the semi-automatic Glock pistols, MPD officers were issued the Smith and Wesson Model 64 and Smith and Wesson Model 67 while detectives had the Smith & Wesson Model 60 "Chief's Special" revolver also in .38 Special.

See also
 List of United States state and local law enforcement agencies

References

Sources

External links
 Miami Police Department (official website)

 
Government of Miami
Municipal police departments of Florida
1896 establishments in Florida